Coprinus is a small genus of mushroom-forming fungi consisting of Coprinus comatusthe shaggy ink cap (British) or shaggy mane (American)and several of its close relatives. Until 2001, Coprinus was a large genus consisting of all agaric species in which the lamellae autodigested to release their spores. The black ink-like liquid this creates gave these species their common name "ink cap" (British) or "inky cap" (American).

Molecular phylogenetic investigation found that Coprinus comatus was only a distant relative of the other members of Coprinus, and was closer to genera in the Agaricaceae. Since Coprinus comatus is the type species of Coprinus, only that species and its close relatives C. sterquilinus and C. spadiceisporus retained the name of the genus.

The majority of species of Coprinus were therefore reclassified into three genera placed in Psathyrellaceae: Coprinellus, Coprinopsis, and Parasola. Coprinus and these segregate genera are now referred to collectively as coprinoid fungi.

Coprinus means "living on dung".

Species

Species of the genus include, but are not limited to:
Coprinus calyptratus
Coprinus comatus (shaggy ink cap, shaggy cap, lawyer's wig)
Coprinus spadiceisporus
Coprinus sterquilinus

Selected former species
Coprinus atramentarius - now Coprinopsis atramentaria (Common inkcap)
Coprinus micaceus - now Coprinellus micaceus (Mica cap)
Coprinus plicatilis - now Parasola plicatilis

See also
List of Agaricales genera
List of Agaricaceae genera

References

Pierre Montarnal : Le petit guide : Champignons (Genève, 1964; Paris-Hachette, 1969).
Régis Courtecuisse, Bernard Duhem : Guide des champignons de France et d'Europe (Delachaux & Niestlé, 1994–2000).  
Roger Phillips : Mushrooms and other fungi of Great Britain and Europe (Pan Books Ltd. 1981 / Book Club Associates 1981) - for the English names.

External links

"The Genus Coprinus: The Inky Caps" by Michael Kuo, MushroomExpert.com, February, 2005.
Studies in Coprinus: Coprinus site of Kees Uljé – taxonomy and keys to coprinoid fungi.
Fungus of the Month for May 2004: Coprinus comatus, the shaggy mane by Tom Volk, TomVolkFungi.net.

Agaricaceae
Agaricales genera